The mixed team archery event at the 2015 European Games in Baku took place between 16 and 17 June.

Ranking round
The ranking round took place on 16 June 2015 to determine the seeding for the knockout rounds. It consisted of two rounds of 36 arrows, with a maximum score of 720. 29 nations entered at least one male and female archer, and so were eligible to qualify for the mixed team competition. The top 15 countries by combined score qualified, along with the hosts. 
World rankings shown are correct at tournament start date.
Key
 Qualified for eliminations

Elimination rounds

References

Mixed team